Events from the year 1821 in Germany

Incumbents

Kingdoms 
 Kingdom of Prussia
 Monarch – Frederick William III of Prussia (16 November 1797 – 7 June 1840)
 Kingdom of Bavaria
 Maximilian I (1 January 1806 – 13 October 1825)
 Kingdom of Saxony
 Frederick Augustus I (20 December 1806 – 5 May 1827)
 Kingdom of Hanover
 George IV  (29 January 1820 – 26 June 1830)
 Kingdom of Württemberg
 William (30 October 1816 – 25 June 1864)

Grand Duchies 
 Grand Duke of Baden
 Louis I (8 December 1818 – 30 March 1830)
 Grand Duke of Hesse
 Louis I (14 August 1806 – 6 April 1830)
 Grand Duke of Mecklenburg-Schwerin
 Frederick Francis I– (24 April 1785 – 1 February 1837)
 Grand Duke of Mecklenburg-Strelitz
 George (6 November 1816 – 6 September 1860)
 Grand Duke of Oldenburg
 Wilhelm (6 July 1785 –2 July 1823 ) Due to mental illness, Wilhelm was duke in name only, with his cousin Peter, Prince-Bishop of Lübeck, acting as regent throughout his entire reign.
 Peter I (2 July 1823 - 21 May 1829)
 Grand Duke of Saxe-Weimar-Eisenach
 Charles Frederick (14 June 1828 - 8 July 1853)

Principalities 
 Schaumburg-Lippe
 George William (13 February 1787 - 1860)
 Schwarzburg-Rudolstadt
 Friedrich Günther (28 April 1807 - 28 June 1867)
 Schwarzburg-Sondershausen
 Günther Friedrich Karl I (14 October 1794 - 19 August 1835)
 Principality of Lippe
 Leopold II (5 November 1802 - 1 January 1851)
 Principality of Reuss-Greiz
 Heinrich XIX (29 January 1817 - 31 October 1836)
 Waldeck and Pyrmont
 George II (9 September 1813 - 15 May 1845)

Duchies 
 Duke of Anhalt-Dessau
 Leopold IV (9 August 1817 - 22 May 1871)
 Duke of Brunswick
 Charles II (16 June 1815 – 9 September 1830)
 Duke of Saxe-Altenburg
 Duke of Saxe-Hildburghausen (1780–1826)  - Frederick
 Duke of Saxe-Coburg and Gotha
 Ernest I (9 December 1806 – 12 November 1826)
 Duke of Saxe-Meiningen
 Bernhard II (24 December 1803–20 September 1866)
 Duke of Schleswig-Holstein-Sonderburg-Beck
 Frederick William (25 March 1816 – 6 July 1825)

Events 
 Prince Ludwig I of Bavaria, wishing to build a monument to German unity and heroism (and the defeat of Napoleon), commissions Leo von Klenze to build a replica of the Parthenon on a bluff overlooking the Danube River near Regensburg, the Walhalla memorial.
 Ludwig van Beethoven – Piano Sonata No. 31
 Franz Schubert
 "Gesang der Geister über den Wassern", D.714; part song for male voices and low strings; Op.posth. 167 (1858)
 Symphony No. 7 in E major, D 729
 Carl Maria von Weber – Konzertstück in F minor, for piano and orchestra, Op. 79

Births 
 27 January – August Becker, German landscape painter (died 1887)
 19 February August Schleicher, German linguist (d. 1868)
 1 March – Joseph Hubert Reinkens, German Old Catholic bishop (d. 1896)
 17 May – Sebastian Kneipp, German naturopath (d. 1897)
 18 May – Eduard von Pestel, Prussian military officer and German general (d. 1908)
 17 July – Friedrich Engelhorn, German industrialist and founder of BASF (d. 1902)
 31 August – Hermann von Helmholtz, German physician and physicist  (d. 1894)
 13 October – Rudolf Virchow, German physician, pathologist, biologist, and politician (d. 1902)

Deaths 
 20 April– Franz Karl Achard, German chemist, physicist and biologist (b. 1753)
 22 May – Johann Georg Heinrich Feder, German philosopher (born 1740)
 10 September – Johann Dominicus Fiorillo, German painter, art historian (b. 1748)
 14 September – Heinrich Kuhl, German naturalist, zoologist (b. 1797)
 21 October – Dorothea Ackermann, German actress (b. 1752)

References

Years of the 19th century in Germany
1821 in Germany
1821 in Europe